Jude Weng  (Chinese name: Weng Fei-fei/"翁菲菲") is a Taiwanese-born American director, writer and producer of episodic streaming/TV and feature films.

Career
Weng's episodic experience includes both multi- and single-camera half-hour comedies as well as one-hour dramas. Directing credits include Black-ish (ABC), The Good Place (NBC), iZombie (The CW), Crashing (HBO), Unbreakable Kimmy Schmidt (Netflix), and Only Murders in the Building (Hulu) as well as multiple episodes of Fresh Off the Boat (ABC), Crazy Ex-Girlfriend (The CW), Life in Pieces (CBS), Young Sheldon (CBS) and Call Me Kat (FOX). In 2019, Weng became the first Asian-American woman ever to direct a half-hour broadcast network pilot, the untitled single-camera comedy by writer/showrunner Jessica Gao.
 
Weng's film credits include directing the Netflix original Finding 'Ohana, a family action-adventure, and co-writing and co-producing Buddy Games, an action comedy, starring Dan Bakkedahl, Josh Duhamel, Nick Swardson, Kevin Dillon, James Roday, Dax Shepard, and Olivia Munn.

Weng's professional training includes the American Film Institute's Directing Workshop for Women, Disney's ABC Directing Program, Warner Bros. Television Directors’ Workshop, and the HBOAccess Writing Fellowship.

References

External links

American television directors
American women television directors
Living people
Taiwanese expatriates in the United States
Date of birth missing (living people)
American television writers
American television producers
American women television writers
Taiwanese directors
American women television producers
Year of birth missing (living people)
21st-century American women